Rokhri may refer to:

 Amir Abdullah Khan Rokhri (d.2001), Pakistani politician
 Rokhri, a town in Punjab, Pakistan
 Rokhri Khel, the sub-tribe associated with the town